Steve Harrison is a British copywriter, creative director and author who is regarded by Campaign Magazine as the greatest Direct Marketing Creative of his generation. He has won more Cannes Lions awards than any other Creative Director in the World.

Career in Advertising
Born in Blackpool, Steve Harrison completed a doctoral thesis on American Society, Cinema and Television:1950-1960 at the University of Manchester. At the age of 30 he travelled to London and secured a researcher position at Ogilvy & Mather. After 11 months he was hired as a Copywriter at Ogilvy and Mather Direct after their Global Vice-Chairman, Drayton Bird, noticed a report that Harrison had written. In 1989 he was made Head of Copy at the agency and by 1997 he was European Creative Director.

In 2001 Harrison founded what was known as Harrison Troughton Wunderman  after the Wunderman owned agency Impiric purchased Harrison's Agency, HPT Brand Response. The Agency went on to produce a number of award-winning campaigns for brands including Xerox, IBM, Microsoft, Vodafone, and Rolls-Royce.

In 2006, Harrison became the first Creative Director to head up the Direct Jury at the prestigious Cannes Lions International Festival of Creativity.

In 2007 Steve Harrison stood down as Worldwide Creative Director of Wunderman following a management restructure of the Advertising Agency.

Awards
Harrison has won three gold, five silver and two bronze Lions for his work.

Study of Howard Gossage
In 2012 Steve Harrison authored a book on the Advertising pioneer Howard Gossage entitled 'Changing the world is the only fit work for a grown man'. Harrison's study of Howard Gossage began when he came across Gossage's book 'Is there any hope for Advertising' in the library of Ogilvy and Mather New York.

Harrison started out intending to make a documentary about Howard Gossage with a friend, he wrote a treatment for this documentary which then became the outline for his book.

Published works
In 2010 Steve Harrison authored the book 'How to do better creative work'. In their review of the book, Campaign Magazine called it 'Essential reading for anyone looking to demystify the creative process'. The book became the most expensive advertising book of all time when it was traded on Amazon.com at $3,000 a copy.

References

British copywriters
Living people
Year of birth missing (living people)